The Mormon Mountains are located in Lincoln and Clark counties in Nevada, between 16 and  northwest of Mesquite on I–15 in the Virgin Valley, east of the Meadow Valley Mountains and Meadow Valley and northeast of Moapa Valley. Another smaller mountain range lies to the east, called the East Mormon Mountains. The south fork of the Toquop Wash drains the east side of the range and continues on through the N–S linear ridge of the East Mormon Mountains.

The Mormon Mountains are home to several different species of lizards, and ground snakes, toads and bullfrogs can be found in the region. The lower elevations of the range are mostly shrublands, but at higher elevations one can find "pygmy conifers" and single-leaf pinyon pines, in the Pinyon-juniper woodland plant community.

The range was named for the fact a share of the first settlers were Mormons. A variant name is "Mormon Range".

Mormon Mountains Wilderness

As part of the Lincoln County Conservation, Recreation, and Development Act signed into law on 30 November 2004,  in the area were designated as wilderness. The wilderness is managed by the BLM through their Ely District office.

References

External links 

Biological Resources Research Center

Mountain ranges of Lincoln County, Nevada
Mountain ranges of Nevada
Mountain ranges of the Great Basin